Felkin is a surname. Notable people with the surname include:

 Hugh Felkin (1922–2001), research chemist 
 Robert William Felkin (1853–1926), medical missionary and explorer
 Mrs. Felkin, pen name of Ellen Thorneycroft Fowler (1860–1929), English author

See also
 Belkin (surname)